The Reichsabgabe was a tax on the postal traffic, levied in the German Empire during the First World War. It was introduced to finance the war expenses. The tax was announced in the ‘Tariff Law’ (Gebührengesetz) of 21 June 1916 and became effective with the new postal rates of 1 August 1916.

In practice the Reichsabgabe meant a raising of the postal rates, the revenues of which streamed into the treasury of the State instead of the treasury of the Deutsche Reichspost, the German postal service. The increase of the postal rates was confined to domestic letters and postcards; international mail and printed matters were excepted.

On 1 October 1918 the Reichsabgabe was raised. Now the printed matter rate was not excepted.

The effects of the Reichsabgabe are illustrated in the following table:

Apart from Germany the Reichsabgabe also applied to the parts of Poland and the Russian Empire occupied by Germany and to the occupied  Grand Duchy of Luxembourg, but not to the occupied part of Belgium.

The Reichsabgabe was ended on 1 October 1919 in conformance to a law of 8 September 1919. However, the raisings of the postal rates were not reversed.

References
Jeroen van de Weide and Ton Welvaart, ‘Eerste inflatieperiode in het Generaalgouvernement Warschau en bezet Rusland; enkele woorden over de Duitse inflatie voor Polenfilatelisten’, in: Inflatieperioden en geldhervormingen in Oost Europa, Filatelistische Contactgroep Oost Europa, 2007 (in Dutch).
Jeroen van de Weide and Ton Welvaart, ‘Erste Inflationsperiode im Generalgouvernement Warschau und im besetzten Russland; einige Worte über die Deutsche Inflation für Polenphilatelisten’, in: Inflationsperioden und Währungsreformen in Ost-Europa, Filatelistische Contactgroep Oost Europa, 2007 (the same article in German).
Michel Postgebühren-Handbuch Deutschland, Schwaneberger Verlag, München, 2001 and 2004 (in German).

History of taxation
German Empire in World War I
Postal history
Abolished taxes